Jefferson Township is one of fourteen townships in Morgan County, Indiana, United States. As of the 2010 census, its population was 3,274 and it contained 1,309 housing units.

Geography

Unincorporated towns
 Hyndsdale at 
(This list is based on USGS data and may include former settlements.)

Cemeteries
The township contains these six cemeteries: Bethlehem, Foster, Hynds, Mount Gilead, Schultz and Stout.

Major highways
  Indiana State Road 44
  Indiana State Road 67

School districts
 Metropolitan School District of Martinsville Schools

Political districts
 Indiana's 4th congressional district
 State House District 47
 State Senate District 37

References
 
 United States Census Bureau 2008 TIGER/Line Shapefiles
 IndianaMap

External links
 Indiana Township Association
 United Township Association of Indiana
 City-Data.com page for Jefferson Township

Townships in Morgan County, Indiana
Townships in Indiana